Maximilian Marterer was the defending champion but chose not to defend his title.

David Ferrer won the title after defeating Ivo Karlović 6–3, 6–4 in the final.

Seeds

Draw

Finals

Top half

Bottom half

References
Main Draw
Qualifying Draw

Monterrey Challenger - Singles